The Senegal national U-20 football team is the feeder team for the Senegal national football team and is controlled by the Senegalese Football Federation.

Achievements

 Senegal U-20's have qualified for 4 FIFA U-20 World Cup finals.
 In 2007 & 2009 they got to the 1st Qualifying round, but got knocked out by Ghana (2007) & Nigeria (2009).
 In 2011 they got to the 2nd round, but got knocked out by Egypt.
 In the 2015 FIFA U-20 World Cup they reached the semi-finals of the finals tournament, losing 5-0 to Brazil and then losing 3-1 in the third-place match against Mali.
 In the 2019 FIFA U-20 World Cup, Amadou Sagna made the fastest goal in U-20 championships, 9.6 seconds after the beginning of the match against Tahiti.

Competitive record

Arab Cup U-20

Recent results and fixtures

2021

2023

Current squad
The following players were called up to the 2019 FIFA U-20 World Cup in Poland.

References

External links
 RSSSF archive of results 1961–

African national under-20 association football teams
Under-20